Established in 1991, the non-profit Network Professional Association (NPA) is a professional association for computer network professionals.

The NPA offers a Certified Network Professional CNP credential and provides advocacy for workers in the field. Members receive a certificate of membership, quarterly journal publications, chapters and programs, and opportunities to volunteer and publish.

Description
The NPA sponsors local chapters, a certification designation, an opportunity to publish,  promotion of industry events and conferences and affinity programs to provide personal goods, opportunities and discounts to NPA professionals.

Each NPA chapter draws its members from a defined geographic area.

Certified Network Professional Program

The Network Professional Association introduced the Certified Network Professional (CNP) designation in 1994. Previously, IT networking practitioners had no professional designation. The NPA, through the volunteer efforts of its members, is involved in initiatives related to setting standards within the IT networking profession: the professional credentialing/certification of individual IT practitioners (the CNP) and maintaining the code of ethics and accountability for the profession. The CNP was updated and re-released to the community in October 2005.

Awards
The Network Professional Association announced Awards for Professionalism in 2002. The Distinguished Fellows membership class recognizes sustained lifelong excellence in the field. The NPA received support for the awards from many partners, Network Computing magazine, Network World Magazine, Interop, National Seminars, Pearson Technology Group, Microsoft, and Novell. Award recipients are recognized for valuable contributions, their continued focus on computer networking and professionalism, and the respect of their peers. An international industry pane of judges reviews submissions and make recommendations for recognition.  The awards are presented at the Interop Las Vegas trade show each year.

Other programs
The Network Professional Journal (NPJ) is a publishing service to and for network professionals. NPA members author articles relevant to the industry. Accepted technical content deals with the advancement of professionalism for the CNP, philosophical or standards based technical discussion, or technical reference guides.

The NPA provides event promotion for network computing professionals. NPA members enjoy discounts on access, exhibition space and sponsorship packages, and conference passes. Conferences and events include: 1992 Hands on Technology Labs staged at NetWorld; NPA’s Integrate Conferences 1996–98;--and since 2002: IT Roadmap; Virtualization Executive Forum; e-Financial WorldExpo; Government & Health Technologies Forums; NetWorld+Interop; LinuxWorld Canada; Desktop Summit; Business Information Security; IT Program Management Office Best Practices; Networking Decisions Conference; National Cyber Security Awareness Month; INBOX; Enterprise Messaging Decisions; PlanetStorage; Wireless & Mobile WorldExpo; Data Protection Summit.

NPA provides affinity programs and co-operative programs with other industry groups. Some  include: Working Advantage; Health Card Program; Pearson Technology Bookstore; Credit Card & Training Discounts; Software / Products; Insurance Brokerage Services; e-Store; Education/Training Loans.

NPA is a member organization of the Federation of Enterprise Architecture Professional Organizations (FEAPO), a worldwide association of professional organizations which have come together to provide a forum to standardize, professionalize, and otherwise advance the discipline of Enterprise Architecture.

References 

International professional associations
Computer network organizations